Robert Stephen Boyer is an American retired professor of computer science, mathematics, and philosophy at The University of Texas at Austin.  He and J Strother Moore invented the Boyer–Moore string-search algorithm, a particularly efficient string searching algorithm, in 1977.  He and Moore also collaborated on the Boyer–Moore automated theorem prover, Nqthm, in 1992. Following this, he worked with Moore and Matt Kaufmann on another theorem prover called ACL2.

Publications 

Boyer has published extensively, including the following books:

 A Computational Logic Handbook, with J S. Moore. Second Edition. Academic Press, London, 1998. 
 Automated Reasoning: Essays in Honor of Woody Bledsoe, editor. Kluwer Academic, Dordrecht, The Netherlands, 1991.
 A Computational Logic Handbook, with J S. Moore. Academic Press, New York, 1988.
 The Correctness Problem in Computer Science, editor, with J S. Moore. Academic Press, London, 1981.
 A Computational Logic, with J S. Moore. Academic Press, New York, 1979.

See also 

 Boyer–Moore majority vote algorithm
 QED manifesto

References

External links
Home page of Robert S. Boyer. Accessed February 18, 2016.
University of Texas, College of Liberal Arts Honors Retired Faculty - 2008. Accessed March 21, 2009.
Robert Stephen Boyer at the Mathematics Genealogy Project

Living people
Alumni of the University of Edinburgh
University of Texas at Austin faculty
Fellows of the Association for the Advancement of Artificial Intelligence
Year of birth missing (living people)
Formal methods people
Lisp (programming language) people